Pocahontas (born Amonute, known as Matoaka,  1596 – March 1617) was a Native American woman, belonging to the Powhatan people, notable for her association with the colonial settlement at Jamestown, Virginia. She was the daughter of Powhatan, the paramount chief of a network of tributary tribes in the Tsenacommacah, encompassing the Tidewater region of Virginia.

Pocahontas was captured and held for ransom by English colonists during hostilities in 1613. During her captivity, she was encouraged to convert to Christianity and was baptized under the name Rebecca. She married the tobacco planter John Rolfe in April 1614 at the age of about 17 or 18, and she bore their son Thomas Rolfe in January 1615.

In 1616, the Rolfes travelled to London where Pocahontas was presented to English society as an example of the "civilized savage" in hopes of stimulating investment in the Jamestown settlement. On this trip she may have met Squanto, a "Patuxet Native American" from New England. She became a celebrity, was elegantly fêted, and attended a masque at Whitehall Palace. In 1617, the Rolfes set sail for Virginia; Pocahontas died at Gravesend, England, of unknown causes, aged 20 or 21. She was buried in St George's Church, Gravesend; her grave's exact location is unknown because the church was rebuilt after being destroyed by a fire.

Numerous places, landmarks, and products in the United States have been named after Pocahontas. Her story has been romanticized over the years, many aspects of which are fictional. Many of the stories told about her by the English explorer John Smith have been contested by her documented descendants. She is a subject of art, literature, and film. Many famous people have claimed to be among her descendants through her son, including members of the First Families of Virginia, First Lady Edith Wilson, American Western actor Glenn Strange, and astronomer Percival Lowell.

Early life
Pocahontas's birth year is unknown, but some historians estimate it to have been around 1596. In A True Relation of Virginia (1608), the English explorer John Smith described meeting Pocahontas in the spring of 1608 when she was "a child of ten years old". In a 1616 letter, he again described her as she was in 1608, but this time as "a child of twelve or thirteen years of age."

Pocahontas was the daughter of Chief Powhatan, paramount chief of Tsenacommacah, an alliance of about 30 Algonquian-speaking groups and petty chiefdoms in Tidewater, Virginia. Her mother's name and origin are unknown, but she was probably of lowly status. Henry Spelman of Jamestown had lived among the Powhatan as an interpreter, and he noted that, when one of the paramount chief's many wives gave birth, she was returned to her place of origin and supported there by the paramount chief until she found another husband. However, little is known about Pocahontas's mother, and it has been theorized that she died in childbirth. The Mattaponi Reservation people are descendants of the Powhatans, and their oral tradition claims that Pocahontas's mother was the first wife of Powhatan and that Pocahontas was named after her.

Names
According to colonist William Strachey, "Pocahontas" was a childhood nickname meaning "little wanton." Some interpret the meaning as "playful one." In his account, Strachey describes her as a child visiting the fort at Jamestown and playing with the young boys; she would "get the boys forth with her into the marketplace and make them wheel, falling on their hands, turning up their heels upwards, whom she would follow and wheel so herself, naked as she was, all the fort over."

Historian William Stith claimed that "her real name, it seems, was originally Matoax, which the Native Americans carefully concealed from the English and changed it to Pocahontas, out of a superstitious fear, lest they, by the knowledge of her true name, should be enabled to do her some hurt." According to anthropologist Helen C. Rountree, Pocahontas revealed her secret name to the colonists "only after she had taken another religious – baptismal – name" of Rebecca.

Title and status
Pocahontas is frequently viewed as a princess in popular culture. In 1841, William Watson Waldron of Trinity College, Dublin published Pocahontas, American Princess: and Other Poems, calling her "the beloved and only surviving daughter of the king." She was her father's "delight and darling", according to colonist Captain Ralph Hamor but she was not in line to inherit a position as a weroance, sub-chief, or mamanatowick (paramount chief). Instead, Powhatan's brothers and sisters and his sisters' children all stood in line to succeed him. In his A Map of Virginia, John Smith explained how matrilineal inheritance worked among the Powhatans:

Interactions with the colonists

John Smith

Pocahontas is most famously linked to colonist Captain John Smith, who arrived in Virginia with 100 other settlers in April 1607 where they built a fort on a marshy peninsula on the James River. The colonists had numerous encounters over the next several months with the people of Tsenacommacah – some of them friendly, some hostile. A hunting party led by Powhatan's close relative Opechancanough then captured Smith in December 1607 while he was exploring on the Chickahominy River and brought him to Powhatan's capital at Werowocomoco. In his 1608 account, Smith describes a great feast followed by a long talk with Powhatan. He does not mention Pocahontas in relation to his capture, and claims that they first met some months later. Margaret Huber suggests that Powhatan was attempting to bring Smith and the other colonists under his own authority. He offered Smith rule of the town of Capahosic, which was close to his capital at Werowocomoco, as he hoped to keep Smith and his men "nearby and better under control."

In 1616, Smith wrote a letter to Queen Anne of Denmark in anticipation of Pocahontas's visit to England. In this new account, his capture included the threat of his own death: "at the minute of my execution, she hazarded the beating out of her own brains to save mine; and not only that but so prevailed with her father, that I was safely conducted to Jamestown." He expanded on this in his 1624 , published long after the death of Pocahontas. He explained that he was captured and taken to the paramount chief where "two great stones were brought before Powhatan: then as many as could layd hands on him [Smith], dragged him to them, and thereon laid his head, and being ready with their clubs, to beate out his braines, Pocahontas the Kings dearest daughter, when no intreaty could prevaile, got his head in her armes, and laid her owne upon his to save him from death."

Karen Ordahl Kupperman suggests that Smith used such details to embroider his first account, thus producing a more dramatic second account of his encounter with Pocahontas as a heroine worthy of Queen Anne's audience. She argues that its later revision and publication was Smith's attempt to raise his own stock and reputation, as he had fallen from favor with the London Company which had funded the Jamestown enterprise. Anthropologist Frederic W. Gleach suggests that Smith's second account was substantially accurate but represents his misunderstanding of a three-stage ritual intended to adopt him into the confederacy, but not all writers are convinced, some suggesting the absence of certain corroborating evidence.

Early histories did establish that Pocahontas befriended Smith and the Jamestown colony. She often went to the settlement and played games with the boys there. When the colonists were starving, "every once in four or five days, Pocahontas with her attendants brought him [Smith] so much provision that saved many of their lives that else for all this had starved with hunger." As the colonists expanded their settlement, the Powhatans felt that their lands were threatened, and conflicts arose again. In late 1609, an injury from a gunpowder explosion forced Smith to return to England for medical care, and the colonists told the Powhatans that he was dead. Pocahontas believed that account and stopped visiting Jamestown, but she learned that he was living in England when she traveled there with her husband John Rolfe.

Capture

Pocahontas's capture occurred in the context of the First Anglo-Powhatan War, a conflict between the Jamestown settlers and the Natives which began late in the summer of 1609. In the first years of war, the colonists took control of the James River, both at its mouth and at the falls. Captain Samuel Argall, in the meantime, pursued contacts with Native tribes in the northern portion of Powhatan's paramount chiefdom. The Patawomecks lived on the Potomac River and were not always loyal to Powhatan, and living with them was a young English interpreter named Henry Spelman. In March 1613, Argall learned that Pocahontas was visiting the Patawomeck village of Passapatanzy and living under the protection of the Weroance Iopassus (also known as Japazaws).

With Spelman's help translating, Argall pressured Iopassus to assist in Pocahontas's capture by promising an alliance with the colonists against the Powhatans. Iopassus, with the help of his wives, tricked Pocahontas into boarding Argall's ship and held her for ransom, demanding the release of colonial prisoners held by her father and the return of various stolen weapons and tools. Powhatan returned the prisoners but failed to satisfy the colonists with the number of weapons and tools that he returned. A long standoff ensued, during which the colonists kept Pocahontas captive.

During the year-long wait, she was held at Henricus in Chesterfield County, Virginia. Little is known about her life there, although colonist Ralph Hamor wrote that she received "extraordinary courteous usage." Linwood "Little Bear" Custalow refers to an oral tradition which claims that Pocahontas was raped; Helen Rountree counters that "other historians have disputed that such oral tradition survived and instead argue that any mistreatment of Pocahontas would have gone against the interests of the English in their negotiations with Powhatan. A truce had been called, the Indians still far outnumbered the English, and the colonists feared retaliation." At this time, Henricus minister Alexander Whitaker taught Pocahontas about Christianity and helped her improve her English. Upon her baptism, she took the Christian name "Rebecca."

In March 1614, the stand-off escalated to a violent confrontation between hundreds of colonists and Powhatan men on the Pamunkey River, and the colonists encountered a group of senior Native leaders at Powhatan's capital of Matchcot. The colonists allowed Pocahontas to talk to her tribe when Powhatan arrived, and she reportedly rebuked him for valuing her "less than old swords, pieces, or axes." She said that she preferred to live with the colonists "who loved her."

Possible first marriage
Mattaponi tradition holds that Pocahontas's first husband was Kocoum, brother of the Patawomeck weroance Japazaws, and that Kocoum was killed by the colonists after his wife's capture in 1613. Today's Patawomecks believe that Pocahontas and Kocoum had a daughter named Ka-Okee who was raised by the Patawomecks after her father's death and her mother's abduction.

Kocoum's identity, location, and very existence have been widely debated among scholars for centuries; the only mention of a "Kocoum" in any English document is a brief statement written about 1616 by William Strachey in England that Pocahontas had been living married to a "private captaine called Kocoum" for two years. She married John Rolfe in 1614, and no other records even hint at any previous husband, so some have suggested that Strachey was mistakenly referring to Rolfe himself, with the reference being later misunderstood as one of Powhatan's officers.

Marriage to John Rolfe

During her stay in Henricus, Pocahontas met John Rolfe. Rolfe's English-born wife Sarah Hacker and child Bermuda had died on the way to Virginia after the wreck of the ship Sea Venture on the Summer Isles, also known as Bermuda. Rolfe established the Virginia plantation Varina Farms where he cultivated a new strain of tobacco. He was a pious man and agonized over the potential moral repercussions of marrying a heathen, though in fact Pocahontas had accepted the Christian faith and taken the baptismal name Rebecca. In a long letter to the governor requesting permission to wed her, he expressed his love for Pocahontas and his belief that he would be saving her soul. He wrote that he was

The couple were married on April 5, 1614, by chaplain Richard Buck, probably at Jamestown. For two years, they lived at Varina Farms across the James River from Henricus. Their son Thomas was born in January 1615.

Their marriage created a climate of peace between the Jamestown colonists and Powhatan's tribes; it endured for eight years as the "Peace of Pocahontas". In 1615, Ralph Hamor wrote, "Since the wedding we have had friendly commerce and trade not only with Powhatan but also with his subjects round about us." The marriage was controversial in the British court at the time because "a commoner" had "the audacity" to marry a "princess."

England

One goal of the Virginia Company of London was to convert Native Americans to Christianity, and the company saw an opportunity to promote further investment with the conversion of Pocahontas and her marriage to Rolfe, all of which also helped end the First Anglo-Powhatan War. The company decided to bring Pocahontas to England as a symbol of the tamed New World "savage" and the success of the Virginia colony, and the Rolfes arrived at the port of Plymouth on June 12, 1616. They journeyed to London by coach, accompanied by 11 other Powhatans including a holy man named Tomocomo. John Smith was living in London at the time while Pocahontas was in Plymouth, and she learned that he was still alive. Smith did not meet Pocahontas, but he wrote to Queen Anne of Denmark, the wife of King James, urging that Pocahontas be treated with respect as a royal visitor. He suggested that, if she were treated badly, her "present love to us and Christianity might turn to... scorn and fury", and England might lose the chance to "rightly have a Kingdom by her means."

Pocahontas was entertained at various social gatherings. On January 5, 1617, she and Tomocomo were brought before the king at the old Banqueting House in the Palace of Whitehall at a performance of Ben Jonson's masque The Vision of Delight. According to Smith, King James was so unprepossessing that neither Pocahontas nor Tomocomo realized whom they had met until it was explained to them afterward.

Pocahontas was not a princess in Powhatan culture, but the Virginia Company presented her as one to the English public because she was the daughter of an important chief. The inscription on a 1616 engraving of Pocahontas reads "MATOAKA ALS REBECCA FILIA POTENTISS : PRINC : POWHATANI IMP:VIRGINIÆ", meaning "Matoaka, alias Rebecca, daughter of the most powerful prince of the Powhatan Empire of Virginia." Many English at this time recognized Powhatan as the ruler of an empire, and presumably accorded to his daughter what they considered appropriate status. Smith's letter to Queen Anne refers to "Powhatan their chief King." Cleric and travel writer Samuel Purchas recalled meeting Pocahontas in London, noting that she impressed those whom she met because she "carried her selfe as the daughter of a king." When he met her again in London, Smith referred to her deferentially as a "King's daughter."

Pocahontas was apparently treated well in London. At the masque, her seats were described as "well placed" and, according to Purchas, London's Bishop John King "entertained her with festival state and pomp beyond what I have seen in his greate hospitalitie afforded to other ladies."

Not all the English were so impressed, however. Helen C. Rountree claims that there is no contemporaneous evidence to suggest that Pocahontas was regarded in England "as anything like royalty," despite the writings of John Smith. Rather, she was considered to be something of a curiosity, according to Rountree, who suggests that she was merely "the Virginian woman" to most Englishmen.

Pocahontas and Rolfe lived in the suburb of Brentford, Middlesex for some time, as well as at Rolfe's family home at Heacham, Norfolk. In early 1617, Smith met the couple at a social gathering and wrote that, when Pocahontas saw him, "without any words, she turned about, obscured her face, as not seeming well contented," and was left alone for two or three hours. Later, they spoke more; Smith's record of what she said to him is fragmentary and enigmatic. She reminded him of the "courtesies she had done," saying, "you did promise Powhatan what was yours would be his, and he the like to you." She then discomfited him by calling him "father," explaining that Smith had called Powhatan "father" when he was a stranger in Virginia, "and by the same reason so must I do you". Smith did not accept this form of address because, he wrote, Pocahontas outranked him as "a King's daughter." Pocahontas then said, "with a well-set countenance":

Finally, Pocahontas told Smith that she and her tribe had thought him dead, but her father had told Tomocomo to seek him "because your countrymen will lie much."

Death

In March 1617, Rolfe and Pocahontas boarded a ship to return to Virginia, but they had sailed only as far as Gravesend on the River Thames when Pocahontas became gravely ill. She was taken ashore, where she died from unknown causes, aged approximately 21 and "much lamented." According to Rolfe, she declared that "all must die"; for her, it was enough that her child lived. Speculated causes of her death include pneumonia, smallpox, tuberculosis, hemorrhagic dysentery ("the Bloody flux") and poisoning.

Pocahontas's funeral took place on March 21, 1617, in the parish of St George's Church, Gravesend. Her grave is thought to be underneath the church's chancel, though that church was destroyed in a fire in 1727 and its exact site is unknown. Since 1958 she has been commemorated by a life-sized bronze statue in St. George's churchyard, a replica of the 1907 Jamestown sculpture by the American sculptor William Ordway Partridge.

Legacy
Pocahontas and John Rolfe had a son, Thomas Rolfe, born in January 1615. 
Thomas Rolfe and his wife, Jane Poythress, had a daughter, Jane Rolfe, who was born in Varina, Henrico County, Virginia, on October 10, 1650. Jane Rolfe married Robert Bolling of Prince George County, Virginia. Their son, John Bolling, was born in 1676. John Bolling married Mary Kennon and had six surviving children, each of whom married and had surviving children.

In 1907, Pocahontas was the first Native American to be honored on a US stamp. She was a member of the inaugural class of Virginia Women in History in 2000. In July 2015, the Pamunkey Native tribe became the first federally recognized tribe in the state of Virginia; they are descendants of the Powhatan chiefdom of which Pocahontas was a member. Pocahontas is the 12th great-grandmother of the American actor Edward Norton.

Cultural representations

After her death, increasingly fanciful and romanticized representations were produced about Pocahontas, in which she and Smith are frequently portrayed as romantically involved. Contemporaneous sources substantiate claims of their friendship but not romance. The first claim of their romantic involvement was in John Davis' Travels in the United States of America (1803).

Rayna Green has discussed the similar fetishization that Native and Asian women experience. Both groups are viewed as "exotic" and "submissive," which aids their dehumanization. Also, Green touches on how Native women had to either "keep their exotic distance or die," which is associated with the widespread image of Pocahontas trying to sacrifice her life for John Smith.

Cornel Pewewardy writes "In Pocahontas, Indian [sic] characters such as Grandmother Willow, Meeko, and Flit belong to the Disney tradition of familiar animals. In so doing, they are rendered as cartoons, certainly less realistic than Pocahontas and John Smith; In this way, Indians remain marginal and invisible, thereby ironically being 'strangers in their own lands' - the shadow Indians. They fight desperately on the silver screen in defense of their asserted rights, but die trying to kill the white hero or save the Indian woman.’"

Stage
Pocahontas: Schauspiel mit Gesang, in fünf Akten (A Play with Songs, in five Acts) by Johann Wilhelm Rose, 1784
Captain Smith and the Princess Pocahontas 1806
 James Nelson Barker's The Indian Princess; or, La Belle Sauvage (1808),
 George Washington Parke Custis, Pocahontas; or, The Settlers of Virginia (1830)
 John Brougham's production of the burlesque Po-ca-hon-tas, or The Gentle Savage (1855)
 Brougham's burlesque revised for London as La Belle Sauvage, opening at St James's Theatre, November 27, 1869 
 Sydney Grundy's Pocahontas, a comic opera, music by Edward Solomon, which opened at the Empire Theatre in London on 26 December 1884 and ran for just 24 performances with Lillian Russell in the title role and C. Hayden Coffin in his stage debut in the piece, taking the role of Captain Smith for the final six nights 
 Miss Pocahontas (Broadway musical), Lyric Theatre, New York City, October 28, 1907
 Pocahontas ballet by Elliot Carter, Jr., Martin Beck Theatre, New York City, May 24, 1939
 Pocahontas musical by Kermit Goell, Lyric Theatre, West End, London, November 14, 1963

Stamps
 The Jamestown Exposition was held in Norfolk, Virginia from April 26 to December 1, 1907, to celebrate the 300th anniversary of the Jamestown settlement, and three commemorative postage stamps were issued in conjunction with it. The five-cent stamp portrays Pocahontas, modeled from Simon van de Passe's 1616 engraving. About 8 million were issued.

Film
Films about Pocahontas include:
 Pocahontas (1910), a Thanhouser Company silent short drama
 Pocahontas and John Smith (1924), a silent film directed by Bryan Foy
 Captain John Smith and Pocahontas (1953), directed by Lew Landers and starring Jody Lawrance as Pocahontas
 Pocahontas (1994), a Japanese animated production from Jetlag Productions directed by Toshiyuki Hiruma Takashi
 Pocahontas: The Legend (1995), a Canadian film based on her life
 Pocahontas (1995), a Walt Disney Company animated feature, one of the Disney Princess films, and the most well known adaptation of the Pocahontas story. The film presents a fictional romantic affair between Pocahontas and John Smith, in which Pocahontas teaches Smith respect for nature. Irene Bedard voiced and provided the physical model for the title character.
 Pocahontas II: Journey to a New World (1998), a direct-to-video Disney sequel depicting Pocahantas falling in love with John Rolfe and traveling to England
 The New World (2005), film directed by Terrence Malick and starring Q'orianka Kilcher as Pocahontas
 Pocahontas: Dove of Peace (2016), a docudrama produced by Christian Broadcasting Network

Literature
 
The first settlers of Virginia : an historical novel New-York : Printed for I. Riley and Co. 1806
 Lydia Sigourney's long poem Pocahontas relates her history and is the title work of her 1841 collection of poetry.

Art
 Simon van de Passe's engraving of 1616
 The abduction of Pocahontas (1619), a narrative engraving by Johann Theodor de Bry
 William Ordway Partridge's bronze statue (1922) of Pocahontas in Jamestown, Virginia; a replica (1958) stands in the grounds of St George's Church, Gravesend
 Baptism of Pocahontas (1840), a painting by John Gadsby Chapman which hangs in the rotunda of the United States Capitol Building

Others

Lake Matoaka, an 18th-century mill pond on the campus of the College of William & Mary renamed for Pocahontas's Powhatan name in the 1920s.
 The  - name of three vessels including one that Virginia Ferry Corporation completed in 1940 for Little Creek-Cape Charles Ferry, sold to Cape May–Lewes Ferry in 1963, and renamed as the SS Delaware, operating from 1964 to 1974
 The 
 The Pocahontas - a passenger train of the Norfolk and Western Railway, running from Norfolk, Virginia to Cincinnati, Ohio
 The minor planet 4487 Pocahontas

See also 
 La Malinche – a Nahua woman from the Mexican Gulf Coast, who played a major role in the Spanish-Aztec War as an interpreter for the Spanish conquistador Hernán Cortés
 Mary Kittamaquund – daughter of a Piscataway chief in colonial Maryland
 Sedgeford Hall Portrait – once thought to represent Pocahontas and Thomas Rolfe but now believed to depict the wife (Pe-o-ka) and son of Seminole Chief Osceola

References

Bibliography
 Argall, Samuel. Letter to Nicholas Hawes. June 1613. Repr. in Jamestown Narratives, ed. Edward Wright Haile. Champlain, VA: Roundhouse, 1998.
 Bulla, Clyde Robert. "Little Nantaquas." In "Pocahontas and The Strangers", ed Scholastic inc., 730 Broadway, New York, NY 10003. 1971.
 Custalow, Linwood "Little Bear" and Daniel, Angela L. "Silver Star." The True Story of Pocahontas, Fulcrum Publishing, Golden, Colorado 2007, .
 Dale, Thomas. Letter to 'D.M.' 1614. Repr. in Jamestown Narratives, ed. Edward Wright Haile. Champlain, VA: Roundhouse, 1998.
 Dale, Thomas. Letter to Sir Ralph Winwood. June 3, 1616. Repr. in Jamestown Narratives, ed. Edward Wright Haile. Champlain, VA: Roundhouse, 1998.
 Fausz, J. Frederick. "An 'Abundance of Blood Shed on Both Sides': England's First Indian War, 1609–1614". The Virginia Magazine of History and Biography 98:1 (January 1990), pp. 3–56.
 Gleach, Frederic W. Powhatan's World and Colonial Virginia. Lincoln: University of Nebraska Press, 1997.
 Hamor, Ralph. A True Discourse of the Present Estate of Virginia. 1615. Repr. in Jamestown Narratives, ed. Edward Wright Haile. Champlain, VA: Roundhouse, 1998.
 Herford, C.H. and Percy Simpson, eds. Ben Jonson (Oxford: Clarendon Press, 1925–1952).
 Huber, Margaret Williamson (January 12, 2011). "Powhatan (d. 1618)". Encyclopedia Virginia. Retrieved February 18, 2011.
 Kupperman, Karen Ordahl. Indians and English: Facing Off in Early America. Ithaca, NY: Cornell University Press, 2000.
 Lemay, J.A. Leo. Did Pocahontas Save Captain John Smith? Athens, Georgia: The University of Georgia Press, 1992
 Price, David A. Love and Hate in Jamestown. New York: Vintage, 2003.
 Purchas, Samuel. Hakluytus Posthumus or Purchas His Pilgrimes. 1625. Repr. Glasgow: James MacLehose, 1905–1907. vol. 19
 Rolfe, John. Letter to Thomas Dale. 1614. Repr. in Jamestown Narratives, ed. Edward Wright Haile. Champlain, VA: Roundhouse, 1998
 Rolfe, John. Letter to Edwin Sandys. June 8, 1617. Repr. in The Records of the Virginia Company of London, ed. Susan Myra Kingsbuy. Washington: US Government Printing Office, 1906–1935. Vol. 3
 Rountree, Helen C. (November 3, 2010). "Divorce in Early Virginia Indian Society". Encyclopedia Virginia. Retrieved February 18, 2011.
 Rountree, Helen C. (November 3, 2010). "Early Virginia Indian Education". Encyclopedia Virginia. Retrieved February 27, 2011.
 Rountree, Helen C. (November 3, 2010). "Uses of Personal Names by Early Virginia Indians". Encyclopedia Virginia. Retrieved February 18, 2011.
 Rountree, Helen C. (December 8, 2010). "Pocahontas (d. 1617)". Encyclopedia Virginia. Retrieved February 18, 2011.
 Smith, John. A True Relation of such Occurrences and Accidents of Noate as hath Hapned in Virginia, 1608. Repr. in The Complete Works of John Smith (1580–1631). Ed. Philip L. Barbour. Chapel Hill: University Press of Virginia, 1983. Vol. 1
 Smith, John. A Map of Virginia, 1612. Repr. in The Complete Works of John Smith (1580–1631), Ed. Philip L. Barbour. Chapel Hill: University Press of Virginia, 1983. Vol. 1
 Smith, John. Letter to Queen Anne. 1616. Repr. as 'John Smith's Letter to Queen Anne regarding Pocahontas'. Caleb Johnson's Mayflower Web Pages 1997, Accessed April 23, 2006.
 Smith, John. The Generall Historie of Virginia, New-England, and the Summer Isles. 1624. Repr. in Jamestown Narratives, ed. Edward Wright Haile. Champlain, VA: Roundhouse, 1998.
 Spelman, Henry. A Relation of Virginia. 1609. Repr. in Jamestown Narratives, ed. Edward Wright Haile. Champlain, VA: Roundhouse, 1998.
 Strachey, William. The Historie of Travaile into Virginia Brittania. c. 1612. Repr. London: Hakluyt Society, 1849.
 Symonds, William. The Proceedings of the English Colonie in Virginia. 1612. Repr. in The Complete Works of Captain John Smith. Ed. Philip L. Barbour. Chapel Hill: University of North Carolina Press, 1986. Vol. 1
 
 Waldron, William Watson. Pocahontas, American Princess: and Other Poems. New York: Dean and Trevett, 1841
 Warner, Charles Dudley. Captain John Smith, 1881. Repr. in Captain John Smith Project Gutenberg Text, accessed July 4, 2006
 Woodward, Grace Steele. Pocahontas. Norman: University of Oklahoma Press, 1969.

Further reading
 Barbour, Philip L. Pocahontas and Her World. Boston: Houghton Mifflin Company, 1970. 
 Neill, Rev. Edward D. Pocahontas and Her Companions. Albany: Joel Munsell, 1869.
 Price, David A. Love and Hate in Jamestown. Alfred A. Knopf, 2003 
 Rountree, Helen C. Pocahontas's People: The Powhatan Indians of Virginia Through Four Centuries. Norman: University of Oklahoma Press, 1990. 
 Strong, Pauline Turner. Animated Indians: Critique and Contradiction in Commodified Children's Culture. Cultural Anthology, Vol. 11, No. 3 (Aug. 1996), pp. 405–424
 Sandall, Roger. 2001 The Culture Cult: Designer Tribalism and Other Essays 
 Townsend, Camilla. Pocahontas and the Powhatan Dilemma. New York: Hill and Wang, 2004. 
 Warner, Charles Dudley, Captain John Smith, 1881. Repr. in Captain John Smith Project Gutenberg Text, accessed July 4, 2006
 Warner, Charles Dudley, The Story of Pocahontas, 1881. Repr. in The Story of Pocahontas Project Gutenberg Text, accessed July 4, 2006
 Woodward, Grace Steele. Pocahontas. Norman: University of Oklahoma Press, 1969.  or 
  This article is mostly about Pocahontas.
 Pocahontas, Alias Matoaka, and Her Descendants Through Her Marriage at Jamestown, Virginia, in April 1614, with John Rolfe, Gentleman, Wyndham Robertson, Printed by J. W. Randolph & English, Richmond, Va., 1887

External links

 Pocahontas: Her Life and Legend – National Park Service – Historic Jamestowne
 "Contact and Conflict". The Story of Virginia: An American Experience. Virginia Historical Society.
 "The Anglo-Powhatan Wars". The Story of Virginia: An American Experience. Virginia Historical Society.
 Virtual Jamestown. Includes text of many original accounts
 "The Pocahontas Archive", a comprehensive bibliography of texts about Pocahontas
 On this day in history: Pocahontas marries John Rolfe, History.com
 Michals, Debra. "Pocahontas". National Women's History Museum. 2015.

1590s births
1617 deaths
16th-century Native Americans
17th-century Native Americans
16th-century Native American women
17th-century Native American women
Native American Christians
American folklore
Bolling family of Virginia
Converts to Protestantism from pagan religions
History of Gravesend, Kent
Pamunkey people
People of the Powhatan Confederacy
Rolfe family of Virginia
Virginia colonial people
American emigrants to England
People from Jamestown, Virginia
Immigrants to the Kingdom of England